An index of articles related to the ethnic group known as the Muhajirs. It covers the post-independence period articles. This list includes topics, events, persons, and other items of national significance within the Muhajirs.

0-9 

 1972 Language violence in Sindh
 1988 Hyderabad, Sindh massacre
 Return to Table of Contents

A 

 All-India Muslim League
 Altaf Hussain (Pakistani politician)
 Return to Table of Contents

B

M 

 Mahajir (Pakistan)
 Muhajir culture
 Muhajir nationalism
 Muhajir politics
 Muttahida Qaumi Movement – London
 Muttahida Qaumi Movement – Pakistan
 Return to Table of Contents

P 

 Pakistan Movement
 Persecution of Muhajirs
 Return to Table of Contents

Muhajir